The Roos House in Natchez, Mississippi was built in 1905.  It was listed on the National Register of Historic Places in 1979.

Its NRHP nomination provided a strong recommendation for the significance of the house:
The Roos House is one of the finest examples of early twentieth-century residential architecture in Natchez. The Colonial Revival and Art Nouveau detailing of the house is so well and unusually executed that it sets the house apart from its contemporary Victorian counterparts. The house is also symbolic of the rise to prominence of the Jewish community in Natchez, a Southern town that was culturally, socially, intellectually, and economically dominated by its Jewish citizens from the post-Civil War years to the Great Depression.

References

Colonial Revival architecture in Mississippi
Houses completed in 1905
Houses on the National Register of Historic Places in Mississippi
Houses in Natchez, Mississippi
Art Nouveau architecture in the United States
Art Nouveau houses
National Register of Historic Places in Natchez, Mississippi
1905 establishments in Mississippi